Triona is a shortened form of the given name Catriona.

Well-known people named "Triona" include the following:

Triona (singer), Northern Irish singer-songwriter
Triona Holden, British artist, writer and presenter
Tríona Ní Dhomhnaill, Irish singer, pianist and composer